The following sortable table comprises the 401 mountain peaks of greater North America with at least  of elevation and at least  of topographic prominence.

The summit of a mountain or hill may be measured in three principal ways:
The topographic elevation of a summit measures the height of the summit above a geodetic sea level.
The topographic prominence of a summit is a measure of how high the summit rises above its surroundings.
The topographic isolation (or radius of dominance) of a summit measures how far the summit lies from its nearest point of equal elevation.

In greater North America, only Denali exceeds  elevation.  Three major summits exceed , 11 exceed , 21 exceed , 124 exceed , 277 exceed , and the following 401 major summits exceed  elevation.



Major 3000-meter summits
Of the 401 major 3000-meter summits of greater North America, 299 are located in the United States (excluding three in Hawaii), 67 in Canada, 28 in México, and eight in Guatemala, four in Greenland, two in Costa Rica, and one each in Panamá and the Dominican Republic.  Eight of these peaks lie on the Canada-United States border and one lies on the México-Guatemala border.  Additional references and maps for the 200 highest of these major summits can be found on the List of the highest major summits of North America.

Gallery

See also

North America
Geography of North America
Geology of North America
Lists of mountain peaks of North America
List of mountain peaks of North America
List of the highest major summits of North America
List of the highest islands of North America
List of the most prominent summits of North America
List of the ultra-prominent summits of North America
List of the most isolated major summits of North America
List of the major 100-kilometer summits of North America
List of extreme summits of North America
List of mountain peaks of Greenland
List of mountain peaks of Canada
List of mountain peaks of the Rocky Mountains
List of mountain peaks of the United States
List of mountain peaks of México
List of mountain peaks of Central America
List of mountain peaks of the Caribbean
:Category:Mountains of North America
commons:Category:Mountains of North America
Physical geography
Topography
Topographic elevation
Topographic prominence
Topographic isolation

Notes

References

External links

Natural Resources Canada (NRC)
Canadian Geographical Names @ NRC
United States Geological Survey (USGS)
Geographic Names Information System @ USGS
United States National Geodetic Survey (NGS)
Geodetic Glossary @ NGS
NGVD 29 to NAVD 88 online elevation converter @ NGS
Survey Marks and Datasheets @ NGS
Instituto Nacional de Estadística, Geografía e Informática (INEGI)
Sistemas Nacionales Estadístico y de Información Geográfica (SNEIG)
Bivouac.com
Peakbagger.com
Peaklist.org
Peakware.com
Summitpost.org

 

Geography of North America

North America, List Of The Major 4000-Meter Summits Of
North America, List Of The Major 4000-Meter Summits Of